Morzeszczyn  is a village in Tczew County, Pomeranian Voivodeship, in northern Poland. It is the seat of the gmina (administrative district) called Gmina Morzeszczyn. It is located within the ethnocultural region of Kociewie in the historic region of Pomerania.

The village has a population of 729.

History
Morzeszczyn was a private church village of the monastery in Pelplin, administratively located in the Tczew County in the Pomeranian Voivodeship of the Polish Crown.

During the German occupation of Poland (World War II), Morzeszczyn was one of the sites of executions of Poles, carried out by the Germans in 1939 as part of the Intelligenzaktion, and local Polish teachers were also murdered in the Szpęgawski Forest.

Transport
The Polish Voivodeship roads 220, 234 and 644 run through the village, and there is a railway station, located on the important Polish railway line No. 131, which is part of the Polish Coal Trunk-Line, which connects the port city of Gdynia in northern Poland with the Upper Silesian metropolitan area in southern Poland.

References

Morzeszczyn